Steven Patrick Danielson (born March 15, 1972 in Livermore, California) in 2019 he completed his tenth season as an assistant coach for the Stanford University's field hockey team. In 2018 he and head coach Tara Danielson and assistant coach Patrick Cota were named the America East Coaching Staff of the Year. Formerly a field hockey midfielder, he has competed for the United States since 1989 in indoor and outdoor field hockey. He and the national squad finished twelfth at the 1996 Summer Olympics in Atlanta, Georgia. In 2018 he was inducted into the USA Field Hockey Hall of Fame.

References

External links
 
 USA Field Hockey

1972 births
Living people
American male field hockey players
Olympic field hockey players of the United States
Field hockey players at the 1996 Summer Olympics
People from Livermore, California
Stanford Cardinal field hockey coaches
San Diego State University alumni
Pan American Games bronze medalists for the United States
Pan American Games medalists in field hockey
Field hockey players at the 1995 Pan American Games
Medalists at the 1995 Pan American Games